Stephen Huss and Wesley Moodie were the defending champions but lost in the third round to Simon Aspelin and Todd Perry.

Bob and Mike Bryan defeated Fabrice Santoro and Nenad Zimonjić in the final, 6–3, 4–6, 6–4, 6–2, to win the gentlemen's doubles title at the 2006 Wimbledon Championships By winning the 2006 Doubles title, their first title at Wimbledon, the Bryan brothers completed the Career Grand Slam, having previously won the 2003 French Open, the 2005 US Open, and the Australian Open earlier that year.  Additionally, it was their record 7th consecutive grand slam final.

The quarterfinal match between Mark Knowles & Daniel Nestor and Simon Aspelin & Todd Perry became, at that time, the longest match ever played at Wimbledon, lasting 6 hours and 9 minutes, with Knowles & Nestor winning the match 5–7, 6–3, 6–7(5–7), 6–3, 23–21. This record was eventually broken at the 2010 Championships, in the first round men's singles match between John Isner and Nicolas Mahut. It remains as of 2018 the longest doubles match played at Wimbledon or at any Grand Slam tournament.

Seeds

  Bob Bryan /  Mike Bryan (champions)
  Jonas Björkman /  Max Mirnyi (quarterfinals)
  Mark Knowles /  Daniel Nestor (semifinals)
  Paul Hanley /  Kevin Ullyett (quarterfinals)
  Jonathan Erlich /  Andy Ram (third round)
  Fabrice Santoro /  Nenad Zimonjić (final)
  Martin Damm /  Leander Paes (semifinals)
  Simon Aspelin /  Todd Perry (quarterfinals)
  Stephen Huss /  Wesley Moodie (third round)
  Mariusz Fyrstenberg /  Marcin Matkowski (first round)
  Lukáš Dlouhý /  Pavel Vízner (quarterfinals)
  František Čermák /  Leoš Friedl (first round)
  Mahesh Bhupathi /  Alexander Waske (first round)
  Wayne Black /  Jeff Coetzee (first round)
  Martín García /  Sebastián Prieto (third round)
  Chris Haggard /  Dominik Hrbatý (first round)

Qualifying

Draw

Finals

Top half

Section 1

Section 2

Bottom half

Section 3

Section 4

References

External links

2006 Wimbledon Championships – Men's draws and results at the International Tennis Federation

Men's Doubles
Wimbledon Championship by year – Men's doubles